Santa Tereza may refer to various location in Brazil:

 Santa Tereza, Rio Grande do Sul, municipality
 Santa Tereza, Ceará, district
 Santa Tereza, Porto Alegre (bairro) in the city of Porto Alegre
Santa Tereza do Tocantins municipality in the state of Tocantins in the Northern region of Brazil
Santa Tereza do Oeste a municipality in the state of Paraná in the Southern Region of Brazil
Santa Tereza de Goiás town and municipality in north Goiás state, Brazil
Santa Tereza River 

See also
 Santa Teresa